The women's field hockey tournament at the 2020 Summer Olympics was the eleventh edition of the field hockey event for women at the Summer Olympic Games. It was held from 24 July to 6 August 2021. All games were played at the Oi Hockey Stadium in Tokyo, Japan.

It was originally scheduled to be held from 25 July to 7 August 2020, but on 24 March 2020, the Olympics were postponed to 2021 due to the COVID-19 pandemic. Because of this pandemic, the games were played behind closed doors.

Competing in their fifth final in a row (wins in 2008 and 2012; losses in 2004 and 2016), the Netherlands won their fourth title, after winning the final 3–1 over Argentina. The defending champions Great Britain won the bronze medal after defeating India 4–3 in the bronze medal game.

The medals for the competition were presented by Gerardo Werthein, Argentina; IOC Executive Board Member, and the medalists' bouquets were presented by Dr. Narinder Dhruv Batra, India; FIH President.

Competition schedule

Competition format
The twelve teams in the tournament were divided into two groups of six, with each team initially playing round-robin games within their group. Following the completion of the round-robin stage, the top four teams from each group advanced to the quarter-finals. The two semi-final winners met for the gold medal match, while the semi-final losers played in the bronze medal match.

Qualification

Each of the Continental Champions from five confederations received an automatic berth. Japan as the host nation qualified automatically. The other teams qualified through the 2019 Women's FIH Olympic Qualifiers.

Umpires
On 11 September 2019, 14 umpires were appointed by the FIH.

Carolina de la Fuente (ARG)
Irene Presenqui (ARG)
Aleisha Neumann (AUS)
Laurine Delforge (BEL)
Liu Xiaoying (CHN)
Michelle Meister (GER)
Sarah Wilson (GBR)
Emi Yamada (JPN)
Amber Church (NZL)
Kelly Hudson (NZL)
Michelle Joubert (RSA)
Annelize Rostron (RSA)
Ayanna McClean (TTO)
Maggie Giddens (USA)

Squads

Group stage
The pools were announced on 23 November 2019.

All times are local (UTC+9).

Group A

Group B

Knockout stage

Bracket

Quarter-finals

Semi-finals

Bronze medal match

Gold medal match

Goalscorers

Final ranking

References

 
Women's tournament
2020 Summer Olympics